Yavnella argamani is a species of ant belonging to the Yavnella ant genus. The species was described by Kugler in 1987, it is one of the two species in its genus. It is native to India.

References

External links

Leptanillinae
Insects described in 1987
Hymenoptera of Asia